Barney's Gang is a Canadian children's television series which was shown on CBC Television in 1958.

Premise
This series was produced in Vancouver and hosted by Barney Potts, a singer-comedian. Children were featured in reports of various places in the Vancouver region. Other segments featured children's hobbies and storytelling, such as legends of the First Nation,s accompanied by drawings.

Scheduling
This half-hour series was broadcast on Fridays at 5:00 p.m. (Eastern) from 2 May to 24 September 1958.

Cast
Children in the cast included Lynne Gormley, Bruce Jagger, and Bernie Eisenstein.

References

External links
 

CBC Television original programming
1950s Canadian children's television series
1958 Canadian television series debuts
1958 Canadian television series endings
Black-and-white Canadian television shows
Television shows filmed in Vancouver